The narrow-barred Spanish mackerel (Scomberomorus commerson) is a mackerel of the family Scombridae found in a wide-ranging area in Southeast Asia, but as far west as the east coast of Africa and from the Middle East and along the northern coastal areas of the Indian Ocean, and as far east as the South West Pacific Ocean.

Description
They are vivid blue to dark grey in colour along their backs and flanks and fade to a silvery blue-grey on the belly. Spanish mackerel have scores of narrow, vertical lines down their sides. Spanish mackerel are the largest of all Australian mackerels, growing to about 200 cm and up to 70 kg.

Distribution and habitat
Scomberomorus commerson is found in a wide area centering in Southeast Asia, but as far west as the east coast of Africa and from the Persian Gulf and along the northern coastal areas of the Indian Ocean, and as far east as Fiji in the South West Pacific ocean. The species is common down both sides of Australia as far south as Perth on the west coast and Sydney on the east coast.  It is also found as far north as China and even Japan. Recorded first in the Mediterranean Sea in 1935 off Mandatory Palestine, it is now very common in the eastern Levant where it has become an important target species for local fisheries.

Lifecycle
Spanish mackerel spawn in oceanic conditions on reef edges. Eggs have a large oil droplet that aids in
buoyancy and keeps them at the top of the water column which is warmer, well oxygenated, and has an
abundant planktonic food supply for the larvae once they are hatched. When in the larval
stage, Spanish mackerel are believed to stay in their own species-specific groups and are not normally found with other species of the same genus, such as S. semifasciatus and S. queenslandicus. This is not always the case with adult mackerel, where occasional mixing of different species within the same genus can occur.

Spawning is seasonal, but it is protracted in the warmer waters of the tropics. Many of the fisheries that target this species are based on prespawning feeding aggregations. A significant proportion of the female fish caught in NT waters between July and December have either recently spawned or are close to spawning. In general, spawning times for Spanish mackerel tend to be associated with higher water temperatures that promote optimal food availability for the rapid growth and development of the larvae.

As the young larvae grow, they move from the offshore spawning grounds to inshore and estuarine habitats, where they are frequently found in the juvenile phase of their growth cycle. In the inshore environments, they feed mostly on the larvae and juveniles of small fish and crustaceans until they become large enough to eat small fish and squid. Australian studies of this species suggest females are larger than males. Female Spanish mackerel mature at about two years of age or around 80 cm in length.

Feeding habits
Spanish mackerel are voracious, opportunistic carnivores. As with other members of the genus, food consists mainly of small fishes with lesser quantities of shrimp and squid.

Fisheries, fishing gear and methods

Spanish mackerel are highly valued fish throughout their range in the Indo-West Pacific. Recreational anglers catch them from boats while trolling or drifting and from boats, piers, jetties, and beaches by casting spoons and jigs, and live-bait fishing.  Commercial methods are primarily run-around gill netting, and rarely, by trolling lures similar to those used by recreational anglers.

In Penghu, Taiwan the narrow-barred Spanish mackerel is highly valued and referred to as "white gold." In 2022 an exceptional 34 kilo fish was sold for more than $3,000.

Parasites
As with most fish, the narrow-barred Spanish mackerel is infected by a variety of parasites. Spectacular parasites are the cysts of the larvae of the trypanorhynch cestode Callitetrarhynchus gracilis, often found in great numbers in the body cavity.

Common names

Pakistan: Surmei سرمٸ
South Africa: king mackerel, couta, cuda
Malaysia: tenggiri
Australia: narrow-bar, narrow-barred mackerel, snook, Spaniard, Spanish mackerel
USA: barred mackerel, narrow-barred mackerel, striped seer
Arabic: In Lebanon, it is called "abu sinn ابو سن" or"ghazal غزال", in Egypt 's Mediterranean and the Red Sea it is "Dirak ديرك", while on the shores of the Persian Gulf it is kanaad, kanad or kana'd كنعد pronounced ‘Chanaad’, according to the local dialect inflection, despite the sound ‘ch’ not existing in the Arabic language.
India: konem in Telugu, vanjaram in Tamil, anjal in Tulu, Shermai  in Dhakhani Urdu,Surmai In Marathi , "Neymeen" "Aykoora" in Malayalam
Iran: shir mahi شیرماهی
Israel: Palamida (פלמידה), Squmbren zariz (סקומברן זריז, meaning quick Spanish mackerel)
Philippines: tanigue
Indonesia: ikan tenggiri
Sri Lanka: Thora in Sinhalese, vanjaram in Tamil
Somalia: Yuumbi
Fiji: walu
Thailand: plā xinthrī (ปลาอินทรี)
 Libyan: yamaneyah يمنيه.

References

External links
Fisheries Western Australia - Spanish Mackerel
 

Fish of Saudi Arabia
Scomberomorus
Fish of the Indian Ocean
Fish of the Pacific Ocean
Fish described in 1800
Taxa named by Bernard Germain de Lacépède